The 2011 Indian Ocean Island Games were the 8th edition of the competition, held in Victoria, Seychelles. The last edition was held in 2007 in Madagascar.

The Games' mascot was a Kato Nwar, the national bird of the Seychelles.

The Games

Participating teams
7 islands, all located in the Indian Ocean, competed in the 2011 Indian Ocean Island Games.

Venues

Sports

Calendar 
Official calendar

Medal table

References

External links
 Official website
 Official facebook page

Indian Ocean Island Games
Indian Ocean Island Games
Indian Ocean Island Games
International sports competitions hosted by Seychelles